Tono Maria was a South American woman who was displayed at freak shows in London during the early 19th century. She was an Aimoré woman who was born in the Minas Gerais region of Brazil and eventually moved to London at some point in her life. Marketed as the “Venus of South America”, Maria was displayed on numerous freak shows throughout the city, where her body scars (which were claimed to signify a sexual transgression she had committed), large figure, lip and ear plugs became objections of fascination for numerous spectators who viewed her.

Life 
Tono Maria was an Aimoré woman who was born in the Minas Gerais region of Brazil around 1782. She eventually moved to London at some point in her life, and was displayed in numerous freak shows around the city. Maria was described in an article written for the London Literary Gazette as being marketed as the "Venus of South America"; the article went on to note that Maria's “charms are reputed to have been irresistible in her native land in which she made conquest of no fewer than three chieftains in succession". She was also described in the article as being "about forty years of age".

Legacy 
University at Albany professor Janell Hobson briefly recounted Maria in her book, Venus in the Dark: Blackness and Beauty in Popular Culture, describing how spectators in London took particular note of the scars on her body which nearly numbered a hundred; with each scar supposedly representing a sexual transgression committed by Maria. Hobson used Maria to illustrate the contrasting depictions of femininity between white women and women of color. American scholar Rosemarie Garland-Thomson mentioned Maria in her book, Extraordinary Bodies: Figuring Physical Disability in American Culture and Literature, as a spectacle that the London spectators used to confirm their “sense of physical mastery”. Thompson also noted that Maria was seen as a cautionary tale of female hypersexuality.

References

1782 births
Year of death unknown
People from Minas Gerais
Sideshow performers
Brazilian women
18th-century women
Sexuality and society
19th-century women
Indigenous people of Eastern Brazil